This is a list of notable people from Punjab, Pakistan.

Religious and spiritual figures

Fariduddin Ganjshakar
Bahauddin Zakariya
Rukn-e-Alam
Shah Hussain
Mian Mir
Sultan Bahu
Shah Inayat Qadri
Bulleh Shah
Waris Shah
Muhammad Channan Shah Nuri
Mian Muhammad Baksh
Khwaja Ghulam Farid
Meher Ali Shah

National figures

Allama Muhammad Iqbal
Rahmat Ali
Liaquat Ali Khan
Muhammad Zafarullah Khan
Jahanara Shahnawaz 
Naseer Ahmed Malhi
Shaukat Hayat Khan
Ghazanfar Ali Khan
Zafar Ali Khan
Muhammad Abdul Ghafoor Hazarvi

Pakistan Armed Forces
General Raheel Sharif, former Chief of Army Staff of the Pakistan Army
General Qamar Javed Bajwa, current Chief of Army Staff of the Pakistan Army
General Asif Nawaz Janjua, former Chief of Army Staff of the Pakistan Army
Lt Gen Asim Saleem Bajwa
Lt Gen Abdul Ali Malik
Maj Gen Iftikhar Janjua
Maj Gen Akhtar Hussain Malik
Major Tufail Muhammad, recipient of the Nishan-e-Haider (NH)
Major Raja Aziz Bhatti, recipient of NH
Major Muhammad Akram, recipient of NH
Major Shabbir Sharif, recipient of NH
Captain Muhammad Sarwar, recipient of NH
Naik Saif Ali Janjua, recipient of NH
Lace Naik Muhammad Mahfuz, recipient of NH
Sowar Muhammad Hussain, recipient of NH

Politicians
Muhammad Zia-ul-Haq, former Army Chief of Staff and former President of Pakistan (1977–1988)
Muhammad Rafiq Tarar, former President of Pakistan
Nawabzada Nasrullah Khan, politician
Yousaf Raza Gillani, former Prime Minister of Pakistan (Pakistan Peoples Party)
Qamar Zaman Kaira, former Minister (Pakistan Peoples Party)
Shah Mehmood Qureshi, politician PTI
Chaudhry Muhammad Sarwar Khan, longest serving parliamentarian of Pakistan from 1951 to 1999
Malik Allahyar Khan (1927–2007), former member of parliament
Amir Mohammad Khan, Nawab of Kalabagh, Governor of East Pakistan
Fazal Ilahi Chaudhry, former President of Pakistan (PPP)
Chaudhry Shujaat Hussain, former Prime Minister of Pakistan, current president of PML(Q)
Chaudhry Pervaiz Elahi, first Deputy Prime Minister of Pakistan, former Chief Minister of Punjab (2002–2007)

Lawyers
 Ijaz Husain Batalvi 
 S M Zafar 
 Ashtar Ausaf Ali 
 Syed Ali Zafar 
 Akhtar Aly Kureshy 
 Azam Nazeer Tarar 
 Hamid Khan

Writers and Poets
Fariduddin Ganjshakar
Shah Hussain 
Sultan Bahu
Bulleh Shah
Ali Haider Multani
Lutf Ali
Waris Shah
Qadir Yar
Mian Muhammad Baksh
Khawaja Ghulam Fareed
Ghulam Rasool Alampuri
Zafar Ali Khan
Muhammad Iqbal
Hakim Ahmad Shuja
Hafeez Jalandhari
Faiz Ahmad Faiz
Ustad Daman
Hasan Manto
Shareef Kunjahi
Ahmad Rahi
Habib Jalib
Anwar Masood
Aizaz Azar
Mazhar Tirmazi
Ali Arshad Mir
Mir Tanha Yousafi

Sportspersons
Ajaz Akhtar, cricketer
Amir Iqbal Khan, boxer
Abdul Khaliq, sprinter
Shoaib Akhtar, cricketer
Abdul Razzaq, cricketer
Wasim Akram, cricketer
Abdul Hafeez Kardar, cricketer
Inzamam-ul-Haq, cricketer
Waqar Younis, cricketer and sports presenter
Shahnaz Sheikh, hockey player
Shoaib Malik, cricketer
Misbah-ul-Haq, cricketer
Saeed Anwar, cricketer
Muhammad Amir, cricketer

Scientists

Abdus Salam, theoretical physicist and Nobel Prize winner in Physics for his contributions to the Electroweak force 
Riazuddin, theoretical physicist and one of the key developers of the theoretical designs of Pakistan's nuclear weapons
Masud Ahmad, theoretical physicist and one of the key developers of the theoretical designs of Pakistan's nuclear weapons
Ayyub Ommaya, neurosurgeon and inventor of the Ommaya reservoir
Mahbub ul Haq, economist and inventor of the Human Development Index (HDI)

Film and TV artists
Sultan Rahi, actor
Shaan Shahid, actor
Bilal Ashraf, actor
Humayun Saeed, actor
Ali Zafar, actor

Singers
Alam Lohar, Punjabi folk singer
Arif Lohar, Punjabi folk singer
Pathanay Khan, Punjabi folk singer
Inayat Hussain Bhatti, Punjabi folk singer
Musarrat Nazir, Punjabi folk singer
Fateh Ali Khan, qawwali singer 
Farrukh Fateh Ali Khan, qawwali singer 
Rahat Fateh Ali Khan, qawwali singer 
Badar Miandad, qawwali singer 
Ghulam Farid Sabri, qawwali singer 
Maqbool Ahmad Sabri, qawwali singer 
Amjad Sabri, qawwali singer 
Nusrat Fateh Ali Khan, qawwali singer
Noor Jehan, classical singer
Atif Aslam, pop singer

Others

 Chaudhary Niaz Ali Khan (civil engineer)

References

People